was a Japanese architect and a key figure in Japanese postwar modernism. His distinctive architectural language deftly blended together elements of traditional Japanese design and modernist tenets from Europe, drawing from early career work experiences in the offices of Le Corbusier and Antonin Raymond. He is especially known for the Tokyo Bunka Kaikan and the National Museum of Modern Art, Tokyo. His home, which he designed and completed in 1942, has been preserved and permanently installed in the Edo-Tokyo Open Air Architectural Museum.

Education and early career
Kunio Maekawa was born in 1905 in Niigata Prefecture in Japan. Maekawa came from a privileged background, and possessed samurai heritage on both sides of the family; his paternal grandfather was a retainer of the Ii clan, while his maternal relatives were retainers of the Tsugaru clan. He entered the prestigious First Tokyo Middle School in 1918, and in 1925 enrolled in the Department of Architecture at Tokyo Imperial University. Though architecture departments were established at Waseda University and Kyoto Imperial University in the same year, the Tokyo Imperial University program remained the eminent and most influential environment for architectural study in Japan at the time. While the majority of his classmates were interested in the German Bauhaus during this period, Maekawa was drawn towards French artistic and architectural precedents, leading him to the work of Swiss-French architect Le Corbusier.

After graduating in 1928, he travelled to France to apprentice with Le Corbusier through the aid of his uncle Naotake Sato, a diplomat stationed with the Japanese delegation to the League of Nations. While in Paris, Maekawa primarily worked under Le Corbusier's brother Pierre Jeanneret, along with furniture and interior designer Charlotte Perriand and architect Alfred Roth. He participated in projects including the unbuilt Cité Mondiale (Mundaneum) center—an expansion upon the League of Nations headquarters in Geneva and a utopian vision conceptualized to hold Paul Otlet's Universal Decimal Classification Collection—the Louise-Catherine barge project by Madeleine Zillhardt, and The Salvation Army in Paris.

In 1930 he returned to Japan and worked with Czech architect Antonin Raymond, a student of Frank Lloyd Wright, for five years. He drew influence from Raymond's expressive use of reinforced concrete, and Raymond in turn was affected by the vernacular tropes in Le Corbusier's work as filtered through Maekawa's Japanese sensibilities. In 1935, Maekawa established his own office, Mayekawa Kunio Associates, and began to enter a number of architectural competitions sponsored by the imperial state. The firm served as a training ground for many Japanese architects who found success in the decades after war, including Kenzō Tange and Toshihiko Kimura.

Maekawa House (1942) 

The careful balance between traditional and modern design principles in Maekawa's early work is best illustrated by his own home, designed in 1942. The Maekawa House, constructed in wood, has been described as a critical node in his aesthetic development. By bringing piloti inside the house to create a two-story space, while integrating traditional grid formations in the deeply recessed windows, Maekawa deftly combined values borrowed from his European mentors with the vernacular building traditions of Japan. The original house, which was located in Kamiōsaki, has been dismantled and relocated to the Edo-Tokyo Open Air Architectural Museum.

Post-war work and style
Owing to the limited resources available during the war, particularly with regards to steel, most of Maekawa's projects between 1937 and 1950 were constructed in wood. Within these restricted circumstances, Maekawa sought to innovate traditional building methods using modernist designs, as can be readily observed in his first post-war project, the Kinokuniya Bookstore in Shinjuku. The end of the war also brought a close to the dominance of the Imperial Crown Style of architecture that had dictated much of the public construction during the early twentieth century across the Japanese empire. As a result, Maekawa and his fellow architects were primed to lean more liberally into their modernist impulses, which were no longer regarded as political threats to the Japanese state. Maekawa himself had, at times, been regarded as unpatriotic during the wartime years owing to his interest in Le Corbusier's non-historicist, proto-Brutalist concrete designs. No longer needing to modify their styles to meet the particular, limiting demands of the state in the post-war, however, Maekawa and his modernist colleagues found greater success with both private and public commissions.

Kinokuniya Bookstore (1947) 
His first major project in the post-war period, the Kinokuniya Bookstore, embodied the spirit of urban renewal and cultural revival amidst the ravaged landscape of war. The two-story wood frame building featured a glass-clad facade facing the street, creating a stark visual and symbolic distinction between the bookshop and its surroundings, the latter of which still largely remained in states of ruin and disarray, dominated by the presence of black markets. At the time of its completion, the front area was still obscured by impoverish barracks and slums, and the entrance could only be accessed through a narrow path leading to the door. The glass facade filled the flat-roofed building with natural light, while Japanese Ōya stone (a material famously featured in Frank Lloyd Wright's Imperial Hotel) was used in the entryway and staircase. Through the combination of vernacular materials and new design strategies borrowed from his European mentors, Maekawa began to concretize his neo-traditionalist approach to architecture, negotiating the needs of a modern society ravaged by war, imperial order, and American occupation while probing new ways of refashioning national identity through vernacular tropes and regionalist details.

Prefabrication Maekawa Ono San-in Kōgyō (PREMOS) (1946-51) 
In the wake of the widespread firebombing of cities across Japan, many Japanese citizens were forced to construct makeshift shelters and barracks out of found materials. Within this context of postwar destruction, Maekawa capitalized on his interest in low-cost, prefabricated housing that had been brewing since his time in Le Corbusier's office. While Le Corbusier's concepts for affordable housing, such as the Dom-Ino House, failed to gain traction due to the high costs of actually producing them, Maekawa was inspired by the free plan advocated by Le Corbusier and the modernist visions for urban living and mass production he proposed.

Maekawa collaborated with aircraft factory San-in Kōgyō (whose owner, Yoshisuke Ayukawa was a client of Maekawa's during the war) and architectural engineer Kaoru Ono to create a production line of prefabricated housing, a project that was dubbed Prefabrication Maekawa Ono San-in Kōgyō, or PREMOS for short. PREMOS produced approximately 1,000 units, which were made almost exclusively out of wood and mostly used as residences for coal miners in rural Japan, although a few were commissioned as private urban homes by clients and friends of Maekawa. None of the PREMOS houses survive today. The houses were supported by L-shaped walls located at the corners of the home, had no columns, and used a collection of floor, ceiling, and partition panels that were all manufactured in the factory before being sent to the building site, where they could be fully constructed within a week. Though PREMOS never reached widespread success owing largely to the actual expenses of the construction and the decline of coal mining in the late 1960s (an industry that had peaked during the U.S. occupation due to the operating needs of national industries, particularly steel), the modernist principles demonstrated in the project—combined dining and kitchen spaces, the Western-style living room, the flat-roofed structure, and the mass-production methods—emblematized the flux of the postwar years and allowed Maekawa to test out ideas borrowed from his time working with European architects within a Japanese context.

Tokyo Bunka Kaikan (1961) 
One of his best-known works, the Tokyo Bunka Kaikan (Tokyo Metropolitan Festival Hall) located in Ueno Park, was commissioned in commemoration of the 500th anniversary of the establishment of the Tokyo Metropolitan Government in 1956. The building contains a main concert hall, used for ballet, opera, and other large concerts, a smaller recital hall, rehearsal rooms and a music library. The 21,000-square foot complex was designed in conjunction with Junzo Sakakura and Takamasa Yoshizaka, both of whom had also apprenticed under Le Corbusier. The building works in harmony with Le Corbusier's National Museum of Western Art (1959), which the three architects had also worked on, and the Japan Art Academy (1958), both also located within Ueno Park. The three complexes are connected by an extended terrace, and the reinforced concrete and formalist cues echo Le Corbusier's structure without fully replicating its visual cues. The National Museum of Western Art is Le Corbusier's only building in East Asia, featuring an austere concrete facade consisting of a rhythmically organized rectangular panels that become compressed as the eye moves upward, adding to the illusion of height that is further pronounced by the pilotis in the interior and exterior of the building.

Tokyo Bunka Kaikan features a wide-set cornice supported by square pilotis, which continue into the interior of the large entrance hall. The upturned eaves are reminiscent of Le Corbusier's Notre-Dame du Haut, while the wooden acoustic panels of the 2,300-seat main auditorium feature organic, cloud-like forms, counterbalancing the heft and linearity of the concrete details. The smaller Recital Hall, which seats 649 individuals and is used for chamber music performances and smaller recitals, has a sound-reflecting panel that resembles a folding screen hung vertically, as well as sound-diffusing concrete niches that similarly call to mind paper cutouts and folds. Both interior elements were designed by sculptor Masayuki Nagare. The forms of the two halls extend above the level of the roof, creating dynamic hexagonal and triangular prisms that enliven the rectilinear structure.

Selected projects
 1932 Kimura Industrial Laboratory, Hirosaki, Aomori
 1936 Hinamoto Hall
 1938 Dairen Town Hall
 1942 Maekawa House
 1952 Nippon Sogo Bank, Tokyo
 1954 Kanagawa Prefectural Library and Music Hall, Yokohama, Kanagawa
 1955 The International House of Japan, Tokyo (with Junzo Sakakura and Junzo Yoshimura)
 1955 Okayama Prefectural Office, Okayama
 1956 Fukushima Education Center, Fukushima
 1959 Harumi flats, Tokyo
 1959 Setagaya Community Centre, Tokyo
 1960 Kyoto Kaikan, Kyoto
 1961 Tokyo Bunka Kaikan, Ueno, Tokyo
 1964 Hayashibara Museum of Art, Okayama
 1966 Saitama Cultural Centre
 1970 Steel Pavilion, Expo '70, Osaka
 1974 Tokio Marine and Fire Insurance Building, Tokyo
 1975 Tokyo Metropolitan Art Museum, Tokyo
 1976 Kumamoto Prefecture Museum of Art, Kumamoto
 1977 Museum of East Asian Art, Cologne
 1978 Yamanashi Prefecture Museum of Art, Kôfu 
 1979 Fukuoka Art Museum, Fukuoka 
 1979 National Museum Western Art Annex, Tôkyô 
 1981 The Miyagi Museum of Art, Sendai
 1982 Kumamoto Prefectural Theater, Kumamoto

Honors and awards
1953, '55, '56, '61, '62, '66 Prize of Architectural Institute of Japan
1959 Decorated with Riddare av Kungl. Vasaorden (Sweden)
1962 Asahi Prize
1963 UIA Auguste Perret Award
1967 Decorated with Suomen Leijonen Ritarikunnan l Luokan Komentajamerk (Finland)
1968 Grand Prize of Architectural Institute of Japan
1972 Mainichi Art Prize
1974 Prize of Japan Art Academy
1978 Decorated with Officier de l'ordre National du Merite (France)

Further reading 

Reynolds, Jonathan M. Maekawa Kunio and the Emergence of Japanese Modernist Architecture. Berkeley and Los Angeles, California: University of California Press, 2001. 
Fujimori, Terunobu. "Modernism and the Roots of Contemporary Architecture." Kateigaho International Edition 20, no. 3 (2008). 
Kumagai, Takaaki. “Maekawa Kunio: Prefabrication and Wooden Modernism 1945-1951.” Dearquitectura 22, no. 22 (2018): 36–45.
Tsukano, Michiya, and Shoichiro Sendai. “Development of the Esplanade by Kunio Maekawa.” Journal of Asian architecture and building engineering 17, no. 2 (2018): 213–219.

References

1905 births
1986 deaths
Japanese architects
Modernist architects
People from Niigata (city)
Recipients of the Legion of Honour